Sixer or Sixers may refer to:

 Sixer (2007 film), an Indian Kannada-language film
 Sixer (2019 film), an Indian Tamil-language film
 Philadelphia 76ers, a professional basketball team in Philadelphia, Pennsylvania, United States
 Fort Worth Sixers, a National Indoor Football League franchise in the United States
 Cricket:
 Sydney Sixers, an Australian cricket franchise
 Sixer (cricket), an act of scoring six runs
 Southern Sixers, mountains in the southern United States which are at least six thousand feet tall
 Stephen Kellogg and the Sixers, an American rock band
 The members of the sixth pilgrimage to Terra Nova, the settlement in the U.S. TV series of the same name
 Sixer, a member of a Cub Pack who leads a team called a "Six"
 Sixers, the slang term for members of the IOI in Ready Player One